Crescenzio Gambarelli (active from 1591 to 1622) was an Italian painter of late-Mannerism or proto-Baroque, active mainly in Siena.

Biography
He worked alongside Rutilio Manetti for some projects. He frescoed the ceilings for the Oratory of San Rocco. He also painted for the Oratory of St Catherine of Siena, two canvases depicting: St Catherine offers her garments to Jesus appearing to her as a poor pilgrim and Jesus offers St Catherine a crucifix. He painted a St Bernardino of Siena pleads before Pope Martin V for San Domenico, Siena. He also painted an altarpiece for the church of San Martino, Siena.

External links

Year of birth unknown
Year of death unknown
16th-century Italian painters
Italian male painters
17th-century Italian painters
Painters from Siena
Mannerist painters